Nightfever is a night of prayer and part of the Nightfever initiative which is rooted in the Catholic Church. The goal is to help those far away from the Church to encounter God and to experience His love and mercy.

Nightfever events take place in over 80 cities in Europe, North and South America, and Australia., and is especially centered in Germany where it began after the 20th World Youth Day in Cologne. To celebrate Nightfever one must be trained by the Nightfever international team to receive permission.

History
Nightfever was founded by students Katharina Fassler-Maloney, a member of the Emmanuel Community, and Andreas Süß, then a seminarian and today a priest. After World Youth Day 2005 in Cologne the pair thought, "This cannot be the end. This great vibe/spirit of the WYD has to go on in our daily lives…!" Only one event was originally planned, but due to its success it was continued, and then spread across Germany, Europe, and beyond. The first Nightfever in North America was held in Halifax, Nova Scotia, in 2012.

On Saturday nights volunteers stand on streets near bars, theaters, and parties in city centers. They approach strangers and say things such as "Hey, want a candle? We’re praying for peace." If the passerby agrees they are welcomed into the church, or the volunteer walks them to nearby church where the event is taking place. Participants are welcome to light their candle and leave, or to stay and pray for as short or as long of a time as they like. When they leave, "their candles burn on as a symbol of their concerns and thoughts."

In addition to lighting candles at the altar, common elements inside the church include the Eucharistic exposed for adoration, contemporary Christian music, submitting prayer intentions, and priests on hand to administer the Sacrament of Reconciliation or to provide prayer, support, and counsel. Nightfever typically goes late into the night.

As they leave, participants are often given items to take with them. In New York, it is small cards thanking them for coming and quoting : “For I know the plans I have for you, says the Lord, plans for your welfare and not for evil, to give you a future and a hope.” In Dublin attendees also left with a verse from the Bible to reflect upon, and in Chicago they were given hot chocolate.

An organizer in Britain describes Nightfever as "a door opener. For those who once had faith in God we hope they will be renewed through their experience at St Patrick's. For those who have never met Christ we hope this becomes a moment of fruitful encounter." Events often see hundreds and even thousands of people attend.

Venues
Nightfever takes place in city center Catholic churches.
 Great Britain
 London, St Patrick's Church, Soho Square
 Oxford, Blackfriars 
 Gosport, St Mary's RC Church
 Manchester, Holy Name Church
 Liverpool, Blessed Sacrament Shrine
 Sheffield, St Marie's Cathedral
 Leeds, St Anne's Cathedral
 Scotland
 Glasgow, St Aloysius Church
 Edinburgh, Edinburgh University catholic Society
 Dundee, St Andrew's Cathedral 
 Belgium
 Brussels, St croix Church
 Liege, St Jean Church
 Leuven, St Antonius Chapel
 Canada
 Halifax, St. Mary's Basilica
 Hamilton, Canadian Martyrs Catholic Church
 Kingston, St. Mary's Cathedral
 Germany:
 Aachen, St. Foillan
 Augsburg, Dom Unserer Lieben Frau
 Berlin, St. Bonifatius
 Bonn, St. Remigius
 Düsseldorf, St. Lambertus
 Duisburg, Liebfrauenkirche
 Erfurt, Lorenzkirche
 Frankfurt, Frankfurter Dom
 Freiburg, St. Martin
 Fulda, Heilig-Geist-Kirche
 Füssen, Krippkirche St. Nikolaus
 Gummersbach, St. Franziskus
 Heidelberg, St. Anna
 Höhr-Grenzhausen, St. Peter und Paul
 Jena, St. Johannes Baptist
 Köln, Kölner Dom
 Mainz, Augustinerkirche
 München, St. Peter
 Münster, St. Lamberti
 Nürnberg, St. Elisabeth
 Paderborn, Marktkirche
 Regensburg, St. Johann
 Saarbrücken, Basilika St. Johann
 Trier, St. Gangolf
 Würzburg, Karmelitenkloster Würzburg Maria Magdalena
 Wuppertal, St. Laurentius
 Austria
 Graz, Franziskanerkloster
 Wien, Wiener Minoritenkirche
 Switzerland:
 Basel, Clarakirche
 Denmark
 Copenhagen, St. Ansgars
 Netherlands
 Oldenzaal, St. Plechelmus-Basilika
 The United States of America
 Holy Name Cathedral, Chicago
 St. Louis Cathedral, New Orleans, LA
 Mexico
 Querétaro, San Jose de Gracia
 Ciudad de México
 Hungary
 St. Michael, Downtown

References

External links
 Official Nightfever website – official Nightfever website

Eucharist
Eucharistic devotions
Catholic missions